The Destiny of Carola van Geldern is a 1919 Austrian-German silent film directed by Carl Froelich and starring Lotte Neumann.

Cast
In alphabetical order

References

Bibliography

External links

1919 films
Films of the Weimar Republic
Films directed by Carl Froelich
German silent feature films
Austrian silent feature films
German black-and-white films
Austrian black-and-white films
1910s German films